William Henry Fitzhugh Payne (January 27, 1830 – March 29, 1904) was a brigadier general in the Confederate States Army during the American Civil War.

Early life
William Payne was born in Fauquier County, Virginia to Arthur Alexander Morson Payne and Mary Conway Mason Fitzhugh. He attended the Virginia Military Institute in 1846-47, but left school after only one year. He was declared an honorary graduate by the Board of Visitors in 1873.

Payne studied law at the University of Virginia and established a law practice in Warrenton, Virginia in 1851. The following year, he married his cousin, Mary Elizabeth Winston Payne, a daughter of William Winter Payne; the couple would have ten children. He served as the Commonwealth's Attorney for Fauquier County for several years.

Civil War
Payne enrolled in early 1861 as a private and participated in the occupation of Harpers Ferry in April. Later in the year, he became a captain in the famed Black Horse Cavalry, serving as  under J.E.B. Stuart. He was promoted to major of the 4th Virginia Cavalry and commanded the regiment at the Battle of Williamsburg during the Peninsula Campaign. He was severely wounded and captured by Union forces.

After being exchanged, he returned to duty as the lieutenant colonel of the 2nd North Carolina Cavalry and fought in the Chancellorsville Campaign. During the subsequent Gettysburg Campaign, he was captured at the Battle of Hanover in 1863 after being dehorsed and falling into an open vat of tanning liquid.

After being imprisoned at Johnson's Island, Ohio, he was promoted to brigadier general in November 1864 and led a brigade in Early's Valley Campaigns of 1864, where he fought in the battles of Opequon, Fisher's Hill, and Cedar Creek. He was badly wounded at the Battle of Five Forks. During the final operations in early 1865 around Richmond, he commanded a cavalry brigade under Fitzhugh Lee.

Postbellum

After the war, Payne returned to his Virginia law practice. He was the general counsel for the Southern Railway Company. Payne served in the legislature of Virginia in the session of 1879–80.

He died in Washington, D.C.

See also

List of American Civil War generals (Confederate)

References
 Eicher, John H., and David J. Eicher, Civil War High Commands. Stanford: Stanford University Press, 2001. .
 Sifakis, Stewart. Who Was Who in the Civil War. New York: Facts On File, 1988. .
 Warner, Ezra J. Generals in Gray: Lives of the Confederate Commanders. Baton Rouge: Louisiana State University Press, 1959. .

External links

"Generals of the Confederate Army."  BigCountry.de.
"Brigadier General William Henry Fitzhugh Payne."  The Virginia Civil War Home Page.

1830 births
1904 deaths
American Civil War prisoners of war
Confederate States Army generals
Fitzhugh family of Virginia
People from Warrenton, Virginia
People of North Carolina in the American Civil War
People of Virginia in the American Civil War
Virginia lawyers
Virginia Military Institute alumni